Khabeeruddin Ahmed (also spelled Kabeeruddin, Kabiruddin or K. Ahmed; 1870 – March 1939) was a politician, lawyer, and a member of Central Legislative Assembly of British India. He was a founding member of the all India independent Democratic Party, and later became a leader of the All-India Muslim League.

Born at Biswanathpur village in Chapai Nawabganj (now in Bangladesh), Khabeeruddin was admitted at the University of Cambridge, and trained as a barrister at the Gray's Inn in London. Upon his return to British India, he enrolled at the Calcutta High Court, and took an interest in British Indian national politics. In addition, he practiced law at the Federal Court of India when it was established in New Delhi. Khabeeruddin died in New Delhi in March 1939. He was a member of the Central Legislative Assembly until the last day of his life.

References 

All India Muslim League members
Indian political party founders
People from Rajshahi District
1870 births
1939 deaths